Micranthocereus dolichospermaticus is a species of plant in the family Cactaceae. It is endemic to Brazil, where it is confined to the states of Bahia and Minas Gerais. Its natural habitat is rocky areas. It is threatened by habitat loss.

References

dolichospermaticu
Endemic flora of Brazil
Flora of Bahia
Flora of Minas Gerais
Taxonomy articles created by Polbot
Taxobox binomials not recognized by IUCN